Dumitru Ciumac (born 7 December 1981) is a Moldovan former footballer who played as a midfielder.

References

1981 births
Living people
Moldovan footballers
Association football midfielders
Moldovan Super Liga players
Ukrainian First League players
Liga I players
Liga II players
Belarusian Premier League players
FC Rapid Ghidighici players
CSM Ceahlăul Piatra Neamț players
FC Dacia Chișinău players
FC Slavia Mozyr players
Moldovan expatriate footballers
Expatriate footballers in Romania
Moldovan expatriate sportspeople in Romania
Expatriate footballers in Ukraine
Moldovan expatriate sportspeople in Ukraine
Expatriate footballers in Belarus
Moldovan expatriate sportspeople in Belarus
Footballers from Chișinău